Fischl is a surname. Notable people with the surname include:

Eric Fischl (born 1948), American painter, sculptor and printmaker
Margaret Fischl, American HIV/AIDS researcher
Peter Fischl (born 1930), Holocaust survivor, poet and public speaker
Viktor Fischl (1912–2006), better known as Avigdor Dagan, Israeli writer

See also
Sportzentrum Fischl, a soccer stadium in Klagenfurt
Fischel
Fischler
Fischl von Luftschloss Narfidort, a character in Genshin Impact

German-language surnames
Jewish surnames
Yiddish-language surnames